The World Summit of Nobel Peace Laureates was initiated by Mikhail Gorbachev in the 1990s, as a forum in which the Nobel Peace Laureates and the Peace Laureate Organizations could come together to address global issues with a view to encourage and support peace and human well being in the world.  Its Permanent Secretariat is an independent, non-profit, ECOSOC non-governmental organization, based in Piacenza, operating on a permanent basis. A permanent staff, mainly composed of volunteers, promotes the work of the Nobel Peace Prize Winners and organizes the World Summit of Nobel Peace Laureates on a yearly basis.  To date, the Permanent Secretariat has organized 17 Summits, the most recent having been held in February 2017 in the city of Merida, Mexico.

List of World Summits

Peace Summit Award 

Every year, during the World Summit of Nobel Peace Laureates, the Nobel laureates honour with the Peace Summit Award the men or women of peace chosen from personalities from the world of culture and entertainment who have stood up for human rights and for the spread of the principles of Peace and Solidarity in the world and have made an outstanding contribution to international social justice and peace. Before 2006, it was known as the Man of Peace Award.

 2002 Roberto Benigni
 2003 Italian National Singers’ Football Team
 2004 Cat Stevens
 2005 Bob Geldof and the PeaceJam Foundation
 2006 Peter Gabriel
 2007 Don Cheadle and George Clooney
 2008 Bono
 2009 Annie Lennox
 2010 Roberto Baggio
 2012 Sean Penn
 2013 Sharon Stone
 2014 Bernardo Bertolucci
 2015 René Pérez Joglar "Residente"
 2017 Richard Branson
 2019 Ricky Martin

Peace Summit Medal for Social Activism 
 2012 Michaela Mycroft
 2013 Jurek Owsiak
 2014 Tareke Brhane
 2015 Arcadi Oliveres Boadella
 2017 Kerry Kennedy

Youth Program 
With the objective of fostering a culture of peace for future generations in Latin America and the Caribbean, the Secretariat is seeking to develop an educational campaign entitled “Peace is Possible”.  Characteristics are as follows:
Flagship campaign:  “La Paz es Posible”
Scope:  Youth (15–24 years old) of Latin America and the Caribbean
Main Objective:  To educate youth about the legacy of the Nobel Peace Laureates and Peace laureate organizations and to foster leadership for peace among youth.
Approach:  Inspirational and knowledge sharing – By bringing to life the struggles and stories of each of the laureates, the campaign seeks to inspire youth with the examples of courage and non-violence set by the laureates with a message of hope and possibility.  Also, by introducing the work of the laureate organizations and the backgrounds of each of the laureates, the campaign will share knowledge about institutional mandates, and the geo-political contexts in which peace has thrived.

See also 
 Nobel Peace Prize
 Nobel Prize
 Paolo Petrocelli

References

External links 
 
 The Gorbachev Foundation
 12th World Summit of World Peace Laureates, Chicago 2012

Nobel Peace Prize
International conferences
Mikhail Gorbachev